Wilhelm Christoforovich Derfelden (1737 – 20 September 1819) was an Imperial Russian General of the Cavalry from a family of Baltic Germans. He fought in the Russo-Turkish War of 1768–1774, Russo-Turkish War of 1787–1792, Polish–Russian War of 1792, and Kościuszko Uprising of 1794. In the latter conflict he led troops in the battles of Chełm and Praga. After a period of unemployment, he joined Alexander Suvorov's army in 1799 as a military mentor to Grand Duke Konstantin Pavlovich of Russia. He subsequently led a corps at Novi, Gotthard Pass, and in Suvorov's Switzerland campaign.

References

Russian generals
Russian commanders of the Napoleonic Wars
1737 births
1819 deaths